The Women's Europe Competition at the 1992 Summer Olympics was held from 27 July to 4 August 1992 in Barcelona, Spain. Seven races were scheduled. 24 sailors, on 24 boats, from 24 nations competed.

Results

Daily standings

Notes

References 
 
 
 
 
 

 

Europe
Europe (dinghy) competitions